Sulian Caridad Matienzo Linares (born 14 December 1994) is a Cuban female volleyball player. She is part of the Cuba women's national volleyball team. She participated at the 2014 FIVB Volleyball Women's World Championship, 2014 FIVB Volleyball World Grand Prix, and 2015 FIVB Volleyball Women's World Cup,

On club level she played for La Habana in 2015.

Clubs 

  La Habana (2014)

References

External links 
http://italy2014.fivb.org/en/competition/teams/cub-cuba/players/sulian-caridad-matienzo-linares?id=38937
http://www.fivb.org/EN/volleyball/competitions/WorldGrandPrix/2011/Players.asp?Tourn=WGP2011&Team=CUB&No=133943

1994 births
Living people
Cuban women's volleyball players
Place of birth missing (living people)
Wing spikers
Volleyball players at the 2015 Pan American Games